Haji Kamran is an Afghan actor, best known for his comedic roles in film and television. Kamran started acting in the early 1980s performing stage comedy. He is best known for his role in the famous series Shirin Gul and Sheragha with Shirin Gul Parsoz, directed by Latif Ahmadi and recorded in Moscow, Russia in the 1990s. He was living in California and does television advertisements and small roles for Ariana Television Network and Ariana Afghanistan TV. He has one son, Farhad Kamran. He usually goes by the name Bache Hajji among his fans and peers. He also operates a film company in Netherlands called Salp films. He starred in the Afghan-American movie In The Wrong Hands and in "Project Peshawar"

Credits
Sheraghai Daghalbaaz
In The Wrong Hands (2002)
Shrin Gul wa Sheragha

References

External links
Reviews of In The Wrong Hands and Sheraghai Daghalbaaz, Afghanland Movie Review, Afghanland.com.

Haji Kamran at Hollywood.com

Living people
Year of birth missing (living people)
Afghan male actors